Maharashtra State Highway 255 (MH SH 255) is a normal state highway in Nagpur and Wardha Districts, in the state of Maharashtra.  This state highway touches Nagpur, Hingna, Kanolibara, Hingni,  connecting with MSH-3 at Seloo. The inner ring road and outer ring road also crossing this highway.

Summary 

This road is one of the important road in Nagpur District providing optional route for Wardha. The Hingna MIDC and Bor Wildlife Sanctuary are along with this highway.

Major junctions 

 This highway started from the intersection at Jansi Rani Square in Nagpur city with National Highway 7 (India)(old numbering) and end at Seloo town connecting with MSH-3 or NH 204 . MH SH 265 is also connecting with this highway at Mohgoan village near Zilpi Lake and MH SH 250  near Dabha village.
Maharashtra State Highway 275
Maharashtra State Highway 354
Arjuni Morgaon Bus Station
Gondia-Nagbhir-Balharshah Branch Line

Connections 
Many villages, cities and towns in Nagpur District are connecting by this state highway.
Hingna
Kanolibara
Hingni
Seloo

Few other important landmark on this highway.
Ambazari Lake
Hingna MIDC
Abhijeet Thermal Power Station
Lata Mangeshkar Hospital, Wanadongri.
Raisoni College, MIDC Hingna.
Yashwantroa Chavan College of Engineering.
Kavi Kulguru Kalidas Sanskrit University, Ramtek.
Zilpi Lake
Bor NationalPark
and many more....

See also 
 List of State Highways in Maharashtra

References 

State Highways in Maharashtra
State Highways in Nagpur District